Lea Melissa Moutoussamy (ليا ميليسا موتوسامي) is a right-handed Algerian sabre fencer.  At the 2012 Summer Olympics she competed in the Women's sabre, losing in the first round to Russian Sofiya Velikaya by a score of 15–6. When she competed in 2012, she was the youngest fencer to ever have participated in the Olympics; she was 14 years and 288 days old.

Moutoussamy was born on October 18, 1997, in Paris, France.  She fences with the club US Metro, in Paris.

References

Algerian female sabre fencers
Living people
Olympic fencers of Algeria
Fencers at the 2012 Summer Olympics
Fencers from Paris
Algerian people of French descent
French female sabre fencers
Year of birth missing (living people)
21st-century Algerian people